Michael McGean was an American ice dancer who competed with Lois Waring. Together, they were the national champions in 1950 and 1952.

Results
Pairs (with Ann McGean)

Ice Dance (with Waring)

References

American male ice dancers
Living people
Year of birth missing (living people)